Kokarev may refer to:

 Aleksandr Kokarev (1909–1991), member of the 23rd—25th CPSU Central Committee
 Denis Kokarev (born 1985), Russian ice hockey player
 Dmitrii Kokarev (born 1991), Russian swimmer
 Dmitry Kokarev (chess player) (born 1982),  Russian chess Grandmaster
 Oleg Kokarev (born 1963), Russian football coach

See also 
 Aleksandrs Kokarevs, former Latvian football player and manager